Gould is a town in Harmon County, Oklahoma, United States. The population was 141 at the 2010 census.

Geography
Gould is located at  (34.669170, -99.773051).

Demographics

As of the census of 2000, there were 206 people, 74 households, and 52 families residing in the town. There were 102 housing units at an average density of 281.4 per square mile (109.4/km2). The racial makeup of the town was 79.13% White, 2.43% African American, 0.49% Asian, 12.62% from other races, and 5.34% from two or more races. Hispanic or Latino of any race were 21.36% of the population.

There were 74 households, out of which 43.2% had children under the age of 18 living with them, 59.5% were married couples living together, 2.7% had a female householder with no husband present, and 28.4% were non-families. 27.0% of all households were made up of individuals, and 14.9% had someone living alone who was 65 years of age or older. The average household size was 2.78 and the average family size was 3.42.

In the town, the population was spread out, with 34.0% under the age of 18, 7.8% from 18 to 24, 31.1% from 25 to 44, 15.0% from 45 to 64, and 12.1% who were 65 years of age or older. The median age was 32 years. For every 100 females, there were 114.6 males. For every 100 females age 18 and over, there were 103.0 males.

The median income for a household in the town was $25,250, and the median income for a family was $28,750. Males had a median income of $20,417 versus $15,000 for females. The per capita income for the town was $12,128. About 10.9% of families and 19.1% of the population were below the poverty line, including 18.9% of those under the age of eighteen and 14.3% of those 65 or over.

References

External links
 Encyclopedia of Oklahoma History and Culture - Gould

Towns in Harmon County, Oklahoma
Towns in Oklahoma